The 2024 U Sports Women's Final 8 Basketball Tournament is scheduled to be held in March 2024, in Edmonton, Alberta, to determine a national champion for the 2023–24 U Sports women's basketball season.

Host
The tournament is scheduled to be hosted by the University of Alberta at the school's Saville Centre, which would be the first time that the championship game is played at this venue and the third time overall that the game has been hosted by the University of Alberta. Alberta also hosted the 2000 and 2001 championship tournaments.

Scheduled teams
Canada West Representative
OUA Representative
RSEQ Representative
AUS Representative
Host (Alberta Pandas)
Three additional berths

References

External links 
 Tournament Web Site

U Sports Women's Basketball Championship
2023–24 in Canadian basketball
2024 in women's basketball
University of Alberta
Basketball in Alberta